The fencing competitions at the 2012 Olympic Games in London were held from 28 July to 5 August at the ExCeL Exhibition Centre. Ten events (six individual, four team) were contested. The International Fencing Federation (FIE) had pushed for the inclusion of two more team events, but the International Olympic Committee voted to keep the current format of ten events.

Qualification 

Qualification was primarily based on the ind. official rankings as at 2 April 2012, with further individual places available at four zonal qualifying tournaments.

Medal table

Despite fencing being its top medal-producing sport, France did not win any medal for the first time since 1960.

Events

Men's

Women's

References

External links 

 
 
 

 
Olympics
2012 Summer Olympics events
2012
International fencing competitions hosted by the United Kingdom